National Dong Hwa University Chinese Language Center  (NDHU-CLC) is one of the most distinguished programs for Chinese as a second language study in Taiwan, which is run by National Dong Hwa University (NDHU) in Hualien, Taiwan. In 2019, NDHU CLC's students achieved 100% pass rate in TOCFL. In 2021, NDHU CLC founded two oversea Chinese language school at universities in the United States.

Taiwan Huayu BEST Program 
NDHU CLC was selected as Taiwan's Best 10 Mandarin Centers in Taiwan Huayu BEST Program by Ministry of Education (MOE), jointly promoting Taiwan's Mandarin education in the United States, Europe, and Australia. With Huayu BEST Program, NDHU CLC received 92.58% expenses support from Taiwan Government and ran two oversea Mandarin Language Centers at Howard University and Oakland University in the United States to bring high-quality Mandarin education to the partner universities.

Taiwan-Europe Connectivity Scholarships 
NDHU was selected as nine University in Taiwan-Europe Connectivity Scholarship programme, which is set up by Ministry of Foreign Affairs (MOFA) to encouraging Taiwanese and European universities to establish or expand academic cooperation via school-to-school partnerships. It aimd to attract students from Europe to study Mandarin in Taiwan and engage in exchanges with Taiwanese students.

In 2021, NDHU CLC has a first batch of fifteen European students in the program, which are from universities such as London School of Economics, University of Edinburgh, SOAS University of London, Free University of Berlin, University of Oldenburg, University of Giessen and from United Kingdom, Germany, Poland, Spain.

Degree Program 
NDHU CLC jointly offers two programs with NDHU College of Humanities and Social Sciences– MA in Teaching Chinese and Calligraphy (TCLC) and PhD in Teaching Chinese as Second Language (TCSL).

See also 
List of Chinese language schools in Taiwan
Chinese as a second language
Huayu Enrichment Scholarship

References

External links

National Dong Hwa University
2013 establishments in Taiwan
Educational institutions established in 2013
Academic language institutions
Language schools in Taiwan
Schools of Chinese as a second or foreign language